The Design Research Unit (DRU) was one of the first generation of British design consultancies combining expertise in architecture, graphics and industrial design. It was founded by the managing director of Stuart Advertising Agency, Marcus Brumwell with Misha Black and Milner Gray in 1943. It became well known for its work in relation to the Festival of Britain in 1951 and its influential corporate identity project for British Rail in 1965.  In 2004, DRU merged with Scott Brownrigg architects.

History

The group officially formed in 1943 following discussions begun by Marcus Brumwell, and the poet and writer Herbert Read the previous year. An early set of notes proposed a "service equipped to advise on all problems of design", addressing the needs of "the State, Municipal Authorities, Industry or Commerce." They anticipated a post-war demand for technical expertise and a need for "the reconditioning and re-designing public utility services" recommending "contact... with the railway companies, motor coach lines and so on."

Herbert Read became their first member of staff, sharing offices in Kingsway with Mass-Observation, another initiative that Brumwell supported under the umbrella of the Advertising Services Guild. Read was joined by Bernard Hollowood in 1944 and after an unsuccessful tour of factories in the Midlands they engaged the sculptor Naum Gabo to design a new car for Jowett. The contract was terminated by the company in 1945.

Black and Gray were initially committed to wartime roles within the Exhibitions Department for the Ministry of Information. Under their leadership, DRU made important postwar contributions to the Britain Can Make It exhibition (1946) and Festival of Britain (1951). At the invitation of the Council of Industrial Design (afterward Design Council), DRU designed the Quiz Machines that sought to gauge public taste at BCMI, as well as the highly didactic ‘What Industrial Design Means’ display (by Black, Bronek Katz, and R. Vaughan). This marked the beginning of a long association between the two bodies. For the Festival of Britain they were the architects for the Regatta Restaurant and designed a series of displays for the Dome of Discovery.

Key DRU commissions included the 1954 Electricity Board Showrooms, by Black, Gibson, and H. Diamond, the BOAC engineering hall at London Airport (Heathrow) by Black, Kenneth Bayes, and BOAC staff from 1951 to 1955, and a number of interiors for the P&O Orient Line's new liner Oriana by Black and Bayes in 1959. Other companies for whom DRU worked included Ilford, Courage, Watney Combe & Reid Dunlop, London Transport, and British Railways. The 1968 City of Westminster street name signs by Misha Black (typography and implementation by Christopher Timings and Roger Bridgman) have become an integral part of London's streetscape.

Since this time, DRU has worked for many high-profile companies, in interior design, graphic design and architecture. Projects of note include:
 Architectural design for: London Underground's Jubilee line extension works, Docklands Light Railway (DLR), Copenhagen Metro, Hong Kong Mass Transit Railway, Nottingham's guided bus system
 Graphic design & wayfinding for: Network Rail, Lee Valley, Tarmac

Their work is the subject of a Cubitt Artists touring exhibition and publication by Michelle Cotton.

Notable partners and associates
 Kenneth Bayes, joined 1945
 Misha Black, 1943–77
 Marcus Brumwell, 1943–74
 June Fraser, 1957-80
 Frederick Gibberd, 1945–46
 Alexander Gibson, (joined 1948)
 Milner Gray, joined 1943
 Jock Kinneir, 1949–56
 Herbert Read, 1943–68
 Richard Rogers, 1967–71
 Su Rogers, 1967–71 
 Felix Samuely, 1945–46
 Sadie Speight, 1945–46
 Ian Thomas Liddell, 1970–98

References

External links
 Official website
 Design Research Unit 1942–72 by Michelle Cotton 
 Design Research Unit 1942–72 exhibition
  
 

Design companies of the United Kingdom
British industrial designers
British graphic designers
Logo designers
Exhibition designers
Design companies established in 1943